The Gemündener Maar is the northernmost of the three Daun Maars (Dauner Maare). It lies in the immediate vicinity of the village of Gemünden and ca. 1.5 km south of Daun in the Eifel and in the German state of Rhineland-Palatinate.

The maar is 30,000 years old which makes it younger than the Schalkenmehrener Maar (western maar lake and eastern dry maar) and is the smallest of the three maars of Daun. Parts of the lake are used for bathing in summer, which has a marked effect on the surrounding nature reserve.

The maar was formed by a volcanic steam explosion. All that remains, however, is a narrow ridge of slate, grauwacke and sandstone between the maar and the neighbouring Lieser valley. There is a footpath around the maar on which one can view the Devonian rocks around the lake. Numerous volcanic bombs may be found, especially in the western area of the maar.

Literature 
 Werner D'hein: Nationaler Geopark Vulkanland Eifel. Ein Natur- und Kulturführer. Gaasterland-Verlag Düsseldorf, 2006,

External links 

 The Schalkenmehrener Maars

Maars of the Eifel
Vulkaneifel
Nature reserves in Rhineland-Palatinate
Lakes of Rhineland-Palatinate